Savoie is a French department in the Auvergne-Rhône-Alpes region of the French Alps. 

Savoie may also refer to:
Haute-Savoie, a French department in the Auvergne-Rhône-Alpes region of the French Alps. 
Pays de Savoie, the name used for both departments as a whole entity
 Croix de Savoie Gaillard, a football club
 French ironclad Savoie, a French Navy ship
 Mouvement Région Savoie, a French regionalist political party 
 Tomme de Savoie, a variety of cheese
 University of Savoie, in alpine eastern France
Savoy wine, a French wine region east of Rhône.

People with the surname
 Calixte Savoie (1895–1985), Canadian businessman, school principal, teacher, and politician
 Christian Savoie (born 1976), Canadian strongman
 Claude Savoie (politician) (1916–1990), Canadian politician
 Claude Savoie (policeman) (1943–1992), Canadian policeman
 Denise Savoie (born 1943), Canadian politician
 Dennis Savoie, Canadian ambassador
 Donald J. Savoie (born 1947), Canadian professor in public administration and regional economic development
 Donat Savoie, Canadian anthropologist
 Evan Savoie, American murderer
 François-Théodore Savoie (1846–1921), Canadian politician
 Glen Savoie, Canadian politician
 Hidulphe Savoie, Canadian general merchant and political figure from New Brunswick
 Jean-Paul Savoie (born 1947), Canadian social worker and politician from New Brunswick
 Jonathan Savoie, Canadian photographer
 Joseph-Alcide Savoie (1872–1933), Canadian politician
 Matthew Savoie (figure skater) (born 1980), American figure skater
 Nicky Savoie (born 1973), American football player
 Réjean Savoie (born 1952), Canadian businessman and political figure from New Brunswick
 René Savoie (1896–1961), Swiss ice hockey player
 Robert Savoie (1927–2007), French-Canadian operatic baritone
 Roger Savoie (1931–2009), Canadian football defensive lineman
 Stéphanie Savoie (born 1989), Canadian baseball player

See also
 Communes of the Savoie department
 Savoy (disambiguation)

French-language surnames